Saloma Link is a  combined pedestrian and bicyclist bridge across the Klang River in Kuala Lumpur.

Directed northwest to southeast it joins the districts of Kampung Baru (northwest) and Kuala Lumpur City Centre (southeast). On the southwestern end a ramp leads up to the bridge, whereas on the northwest there are stairs and an elevator from street level. The bridge’s architecture is inspired by the sireh junjung (betel nut leaf arrangement) concept, which is an integral part of a Malay wedding. At night, the bridge cannot be accessed (from 01:00 until 05:00 from Monday to Saturday and 0:30 until 05:00 on Sundays and public holidays). The name is derived from the Malaysian-Singaporean singer Saloma, who is buried at the nearby Jalan Ampang Muslim Cemetery.

VERITAS Design Group designed the structure, which opened to the public on 5 February 2020. The project cost 31 million Ringgit Malaysia ($7.5 million).

Gallery

See also 
Elmina Rainbow Bridge

References

2020 establishments in Malaysia
Bridges completed in 2020
Pedestrian bridges in Malaysia